Debagoiena is one of the seven eskualdeak/comarcas of Gipuzkoa, Spain. There are eight municipalities in Debagoiena, the biggest of which being Arrasate/Mondragón.

Communities

Comarcas of Gipuzkoa